The Sunshine class is a class of cruise ships owned by Carnival Cruise Line. The class was formerly known as the Destiny class until 2013 when Carnival Destiny was renamed Carnival Sunshine. This transformation continued with sister ships Carnival Triumph in 2019 and Carnival Victory in 2021

History 
 was launched in 1996 as the first in Carnival Cruise Line's Destiny class of ships. A sister ship, Carnival Triumph, launched in 1999 and was followed  by Carnival Victory in 2000. Though similar to Carnival Destiny, Carnival Triumph and Carnival Victory were larger, each containing an additional passenger deck and additional cabins. As a result, both stood apart from the Destiny class and were ultimately classified as Triumph-class ships. Carnival Cruise Line and Costa Cruises would build larger variations based on the Destiny-class ships in the years that followed.

In 2013, Carnival began a series of dry-docks which transformed its three ships, Carnival Destiny, Carnival Triumph, and Carnival Victory, almost entirely, resulting in name changes for all three after the refits were completed. As a result, Carnival now collectively refers to these ships as the Sunshine class.

Sunshine/Fortuna-class ships

References

External links 
 Carnival Cruise Lines
 Carnival Ship Class Guide (as of March 2020)

Cruise ship classes
Carnival Cruise Lines
Ships built by Fincantieri